Three Way Independent School District is a public school district in Erath County, Texas. A small portion of the district extends into Somervell County.

As of 2019, the district serves students in grades pre-kindergarten through ten, and will add a grade each year to reach 12th grade.

In 2009, the school district was rated "academically acceptable" by the Texas Education Agency.

History
It was reclassified to an independent school district on July 1, 1988. Its ID number changed from #072-050 to #072-901.

References

External links
Three Way ISD - Official site.

School districts in Erath County, Texas
School districts in Somervell County, Texas